Tandy Warnow is an American computer scientist and  Grainger Distinguished Chair in Engineering at the University of Illinois at Urbana–Champaign. She is known for her work on the reconstruction of evolutionary trees, both in biology and in historical linguistics, and also for multiple sequence alignment methods.

Biography
Warnow did both her undergraduate and graduate studies in mathematics at the University of California, Berkeley, earning a bachelor's degree in 1984 and a PhD in 1991 under the supervision of Eugene Lawler. The other members of her dissertation committee were Richard Karp, Manuel Blum, Dan Gusfield, and David Gale.

Research and career
After postdoctoral research at the University of Southern California from 1991-1992 (postdoctoral supervisors Michael Waterman and Simon Tavare) and at Sandia National Laboratories in Albuquerque from 1992-1993, she took a faculty position at the University of Pennsylvania, where she remained until moving in 1999 to the University of Texas.  In 2014, Warnow joined the faculty of the University of Illinois in Urbana-Champaign, where she is the Grainger Distinguished Chair in Engineering and Associate Head of the Department of Computer Science. Warnow has courtesy appointments in the Departments of Animal Biology, Bioengineering, Electrical and Computer Engineering, Entomology, Mathematics, Plant Biology, and Statistics.

In 1995, research by Warnow, Donald Ringe, and Ann Taylor at the University of Pennsylvania based on perfect phylogeny computations provided a comprehensive theory for the timing of the early subdivisions in the Indo-European languages. Their computations lent support to the Indo-Hittite hypothesis according to which the first of these subdivisions to separate from the rest of the Indo-European languages were the Anatolian languages. Their results also support the Graeco-Armenian hypothesis, according to which the Armenian language and Greek language form a subfamily of Indo-European. They fit the Germanic languages into the evolutionary tree of Indo-European languages, previously considered problematic, by hypothesizing that the Proto-Germanic language was closely related to the Balto-Slavic languages but then became modified by westward migrations of the Germanic tribes which led them into contact with Italic and Celtic speakers. This perfect phylogeny approach was later extended by Warnow and colleagues to allow for undetected borrowing between languages, so that language evolution is modelled with a network rather than a tree.

In 2009, Warnow and her colleagues released their SATé software for co-estimating biological multiple sequence alignments and evolutionary trees. Their software is based less strongly on firm mathematical principles than some previous co-estimation methods (such as BAli-Phy), but is significantly faster, allowing the fast construction of highly accurate trees and alignments for thousands of species. In comparison, the slow performance of previous methods limited them to only comparing dozens of species at a time.

Her work since 2014 has focused on three topics: scaling multiple sequence alignments to ultra-large datasets, species tree estimation using multiple genes (and addressing gene tree heterogeneity due to incomplete lineage sorting), and metagenomics. Her major contributions in these topics include the PASTA method for co-estimation of alignments and trees, which improves on SATé, and can produce highly accurate alignments with up to 1,000,000 sequences. She has also developed the ASTRAL method for species tree estimation, which is a statistically consistent method for constructing species trees in the presence of incomplete lineage sorting.

Awards and honors
Warnow was named a Grainger Distinguished Chair in Engineering in 2020 and Founder Professor of Engineering in 2014 (both at the University of Illinois at Urbana-Champaign), and the David Bruton Jr. Centennial Professorship in Computer Science at the University of Texas at Austin in 2010.
Warnow also received a John Simon Guggenheim Foundation Fellowship in 2011, a Radcliffe Institute Fellowship in 2003, a David and Lucile Packard Foundation Fellowship in 1996, and  the NSF Young Investigator Award in 1994.
In 2015, she was named a Fellow of Association for Computing Machinery (ACM) "For contributions to mathematical theory, algorithms, and software for large-scale molecular phylogenetics and historical linguistics". In 2017, she was elected as a Fellow of the International Society for Computational Biology (ISCB).
She was named to the 2021 class of Fellows of the American Association for the Advancement of Science.

Personal life
Warnow's mother was noted archivist Joan Warnow-Blewett, and her father was Morton Warnow, the son of the band leader Mark Warnow and nephew of the composer Raymond Scott. Her twin sister is Kimmen Sjolander, a bioinformatics researcher and emeritus faculty member at the University of California. She is married to George Chacko.

References

Year of birth missing (living people)
Living people
American bioinformaticians
American women computer scientists
Evolutionary biologists
Women evolutionary biologists
Historical linguists
UC Berkeley College of Letters and Science alumni
University of Pennsylvania faculty
University of Texas at Austin faculty
Fellows of the Association for Computing Machinery
Fellows of the International Society for Computational Biology
Fellows of the American Association for the Advancement of Science
American women academics
21st-century American women